Linkenchelys multipora is a species of deep-water eel in the family Synaphobranchidae. It is the only member of its genus. It is only known from around the Bahamas at around 238 meters.

References

Synaphobranchidae
Fish described in 1989